Western Shore  is a community in the Canadian province of Nova Scotia, located in the Chester Municipal District.

References
Western Shore
Western Shore on Destination Nova Scotia

Communities in Lunenburg County, Nova Scotia
General Service Areas in Nova Scotia